Almost a Honeymoon may refer to:

 Almost a Honeymoon (play), a 1930 play by Walter Ellis
 Almost a Honeymoon (1930 film), a 1930 British film adaptation
 Almost a Honeymoon (1938 film), a 1938 British film adaptation